Samer Al Barkawi (born 5 September 1973), is a Syrian director. He is best known as the director of popular television serials and films Al Hayba, Djemai Family, Sultan Achour and 10 Bouzid Days.

Personal life
He was born on 5 September 1973 in Syria. He graduated with a degree in business management from the University of Damascus in 1994.

Career
In 2010, he directed his maiden film Baed Al Sokoot. Then he made the television serial Khawatim in 2012. In 2013, he directed the serial Loabat El Mawt (Game of Death) which had its official television screening on 10 July 2013 in Egypt. Later, it was released in Lebanon. After the success of the series, he made the and A Cry of a Soul: Sarkhet Roh in 2013.

He also made several critical acclaimed short films such as Nur and The Poster in 2003, Yousry Nasrallah in 2005, and Kalam Harim: Women's Talk in 2006. In 2017, he made Syrian-Lebanese drama television series Al Hayba. The serial received large popularity with some criticism with representations of women and domestic violence. The series was spanned for four seasons. The series first aired on Middle East Broadcasting Center (MBC) to the Arab world on 27 May 2017. and continued up to date.

Filmography

References

External links
 
 Samer Al Barkawi's Personal Website

Living people
Syrian television people
1973 births
Syrian television directors
Syrian film directors
Damascus University alumni